Lirio may refer to:

People
 Bruna Lirio (born 1994), Brazilian model
 Carmen de Lirio (1926–2014), Spanish film actress
 Lirio Abbate Abbate (born 1971), Italian journalist
 Sheila Lirio Marcelo Marcelo (born 1970), Filipino-American entrepreneur

Places
 Lirio, Lombardy, Italy
 Monte Lirio, Panama

Other
 Lirio (story), short story by Peter Solis Nery